Paniluk Qamanirq (born 1935) is an Inuit artist known for her stone sculpture.  She lives in Arctic Bay, Nunavut.

Her work is included in the collections of the National Gallery of Canada and the Winnipeg Art Gallery.

References

1935 births
20th-century Canadian sculptors
20th-century Canadian women artists
21st-century Canadian sculptors
21st-century Canadian women artists
Inuit sculptors
Living people
Canadian women sculptors